Thomas McIlvaine (October 4, 1854 – December 7, 1933) was an American illustrator.

Life
McIlvaine was born in Philadelphia, Pennsylvania in 1854. He married Sybilla Mayer in 1880, and the couple had three sons: Perry, Thomas Jr., and Roy. He died in Brooklyn, New York on December 7, 1933.

Work

McIlvaine was primarily noted as an illustrator. He contributed 100 illustrations to an 1890 edition of Thomas Moore's poem Lalla Rookh. In 1893 he provided twelve full-page watercolors, twelve full-page halftones, and other smaller illustrations for Frederick A. Stokes Company's edition of Lucile by Robert Bulwer-Lytton (writing as "Owen Meredith").

Other Works:
 The Arabian Nights' Entertainments (2 v.); George Fyler Townsend (ed.); 1891
 100 illustrations from Selections from the Poetical Works of Robert Browning; 1892
 The Princess Margarethe; John D. Barry; 1893
 20 illustrations from The Wonderful “One-Hoss-Shay” And Other Poems;  Oliver Wendell Holmes Sr.; 1897
 Mother-Song and Child-Song; Charlotte Brewster Jordan (ed.); 1898
 A Treasury of American Verse; Walter Learned (ed.); 1901 (with H.C.Edwards)
 The Sociable Ghost; "Olive Harper" (Ellen D'Apery); 1903 (with A.W. Schwartz)
 The Dear Old Home; Sara Ellmaker Ambler; 1906

References

External links

 1890 edition of Lalla Rookh illustrated by Thomas McIlvaine at the Internet Archive
 1893 edition of Lucile illustrated by Thomas McIlvaine at Google Books

American illustrators
1854 births
1933 deaths
People from Brooklyn
People from Philadelphia